Zoom (stylized as ZOOM) is a half-hour educational television program, created almost entirely by children, which aired on PBS originally from January 9, 1972, to February 10, 1978, with reruns being shown until September 12, 1980. It was originated and produced by WGBH-TV in Boston. Inspired by educational shows like Sesame Street and The Electric Company, but designed to give the kids who watched it a voice without adults on screen, it was, for the most part, unscripted.  Far from seeking to make stars of the child performers, their contracts prohibited them from making any television appearances or doing commercials for three years after they left the show.

The show was revived in 1999 and aired on PBS until 2005.

Description
On the show, a cast of seven kids (ten in Season 4) known as Zoomers presented various activities such as games, plays, poems, recipes, jokes, movies and science experiments, all suggested by viewer contributions. These activities were introduced by such titles as Zoomovie, Zoom Play of the Week, Zoomgame, Zoomdo, Zoomgoody, Zoomphenomenon, etc. The cast also had informal chats on subjects such as hospitals, school, family and prejudice, titled Zoomraps. Each episode ended with a choreographed song performed by the cast.  

The young Zoomers were only identified by first names, and in the early seasons half the cast were replaced every six months, allowing a set of veteran cast members to help new members become accustomed to the show. The cast was chosen by audition, and the producers made efforts to include children of multiple cultures and backgrounds.

The mail-in request became a pop culture reference for its musical exhortation to "Write Zoom, Z-double-O-M, Box 3-5-0, Boston, Mass 0-2-1-3-4: send it to Zoom!". The lines were mostly spoken, but the ZIP Code was sung. 

In the opening sequence, each cast member performed a brief "signature move," and second season cast member Bernadette's "arm thing" (a helicopter-like series of arm moves) became famous among the show's young audience. By popular demand, Bernadette eventually explained on the show how to perform the move.

The program featured its own language, Ubbi-Dubbi, where the syllable "ub" was added before each vowel sound in each syllable of each word ("H-ub-i, fr-ub-iends," etc.). For the first two seasons, a word game called "Fannee Doolee" was featured, in which a series of statements about the titular character were presented to the audience without further explanation (e.g., "Fannee Doolee likes sweets, but hates candy"). It was eventually revealed that Fannee Doolee loved all words with double letters and hated all words without them.

Each show had one or two Zoomguest sequences, short film documentaries about children with special talents (singing, tap-dancing, instrument-making, etc.) or interesting hobbies or jobs. The premiere episode featured a boy who built a boat by making a ring of sticks and twigs and covering them with a tarpaulin.

Throughout the show's run, Newton Wayland was the musical director, while Billy Wilson handled choreography during the first four seasons.

In the show's first two seasons, Tracy hosted a "Tracy Asks..." sequence in which she asked a question, e.g., "Which came first, the chicken or the egg?" or "What is the world's longest word?", and local children were filmed giving their answers. In later episodes, other cast members hosted and the segment was retitled "Zoom in the Street." The first two seasons had "quickie" comedy routines modeled after Rowan and Martin's Laugh-In. Season 4 featured a recurring mock-soap opera titled As the World Zooms.

The performers in the original series were known for wearing striped rugby shirts and jeans.  The cast often performed barefoot in Seasons 1 and 2 but wore shoes from Season 3 on.

The first Zoom series lasted six seasons (1972–1978) and featured 49 Zoomers. During the second and third seasons, cast members were transitioned with a catchy production number that introduced the new cast members to the continuing cast members.  The same song was used for each transition ("How do ya do do-dee-do, how do ya do-dee-do-dee-do, how's your sister, how's your brother, how are you?"), based on the Woody Guthrie song "Howjadoo." In the last three seasons, entirely new casts were used.

Several episodes were available with captions for the hearing-impaired.

Cast (in order by introduction in the opening song)

Some PBS stations continued to broadcast reruns of the series until September 12, 1980.

Merchandise
In 1973, the cast members from the first season released an album called Playgrounds (LP ), produced by Rupert Holmes, that was available by mail order.

In 1974, A&M Records released an album of songs from the show titled Come on and Zoom (LP ; cassette ), featuring cast members from the second season. The catalogue number of the album was SP-3402 (213 402 under the PolyGram system).

In 1977, Rounder Records released  Zoom Tunes, featuring cast members from the fourth season. John Nagy and Newton Wayland produced the latter two albums.

Two books for children were based on the 1970s Zoom series:
The Zoom Catalog, published by Random House in 1972, was a collection of stories, poems, plays, jokes and activities from the show, featuring the second cast.
Do a Zoomdo, published by Little Brown in 1975, was a collection of activities from the show, featuring cast members from the second and third seasons.

On December 1, 1998, WGBH released the video-and-book set Best of the 70s and Zoomers Revisited — Where Are They Now?.

On October 28, 2008, WGBH released a two-DVD set, Zoom Back to the '70s. The first DVD was a reissue of Best of the 70s, with extras consisting of behind the scenes stills set to the theme song and a 10-question quiz asking what a few of the cast members are doing today. The second DVD consisted of four episodes from the series.

50th Anniversary
At the show's 50th anniversary in 2022, WGBH posted all surviving episodes online. On January 28, 2022, original executive producer Christopher Sarson and members of the first cast appeared in online video chats, followed on February 2, 2022 by a chat with Sarson and cast members from the second and third seasons.

See also 

 Studio See, another PBS children's program that used content from viewers
 Zoom (1999 TV series), 1999 remake of the 1972 series
 Play School, the series Zoom was inspired by

References

External links
 
“'Come on and ZOOM!': ZOOM and 1970s American Childhood" by Leslie Paris
Sunny Days (book) by David Kamp

Television series by WGBH
English-language television shows
1970s American children's television series
1972 American television series debuts
1978 American television series endings
PBS Kids shows
PBS original programming
American children's education television series
Television series about children
Television shows filmed in Boston